In Irish mythology Fiacha Cennfinnán (modern spelling: Fiacha Ceannfhionnán meaning "Fiacha [of the] little white head"), son of Starn, son of Rudraige, of the Fir Bolg, became High King of Ireland when he overthrew his great-uncle Sengann.

He ruled for five years, until he was overthrown by Rinnal, son of Genann.

The Milesian king Fíachu Findoilches is sometimes known by the same name.

Primary sources
 Lebor Gabála Érenn
 Annals of the Four Masters
 Seathrún Céitinn's Foras Feasa ar Érinn

Legendary High Kings of Ireland
Fir Bolg